Kadri Jäätma (born 4 February 1961 in Tallinn) is an Estonian ceramicist, actress and politician. She was a member of IX Riigikogu.

In 1979, Jäätma appeared as the daughter Liina in the Sulev Nõmmik directed comedy film Siin me oleme!. She later went to become a potter and ceramicist. She has been a member of Pro Patria Union.

Gallery

References

Living people
1961 births
Estonian women ceramists
20th-century Estonian women artists
21st-century Estonian women artists
Pro Patria Union politicians
Members of the Riigikogu, 1999–2003
Women members of the Riigikogu
Estonian film actresses
Estonian television actresses
Estonian Academy of Arts alumni
Artists from Tallinn
People from Tallinn
Politicians from Tallinn
21st-century Estonian women politicians